This is a list of major cities in Madagascar with population (1993 census and 2018 census), region, and former province. These are listed in order of their 2018 population. Note that these are the populations of the cities themselves (i.e. administrative districts, except in the case of Ambovombe) and exclude the populations of suburban communes outside the cities; some of the communes adjacent to Antananarivo have more than 100,000 population themselves.

Smaller cities and towns
This is an alphabetically-ordered list of smaller cities and towns in Madagascar with population (1993 census and 2001 estimate), region, and province.

See also
 List of cities in East Africa

References

 Décret n° 95-381 du 26 mai 1995 portant classement des Communes en Communes urbaines ou en Communes rurales

Madagascar, List of cities in
 
 
Madagascar
Cities